2018 Men's European Water Polo Championship Qualifiers are series of qualification tournaments to decide the participants of the 2018 Men's European Water Polo Championship.

Qualified teams
Teams directly qualified to the 2018 European Water Polo Championship:
 – winners of the 2016 Men's European Water Polo Championship
 – runners-up of the 2016 Men's European Water Polo Championship
 – 3rd place of the 2016 Men's European Water Polo Championship
 – 4th place of the 2016 Men's European Water Polo Championship
 – Host nation and 5th place of the 2016 Men's European Water Polo Championship
 – 6th place of the 2016 Men's European Water Polo Championship
 – 7th place of the 2016 Men's European Water Polo Championship
 – 8th place of the 2016 Men's European Water Polo Championship

Qualifying round 1

Qualifying round 2

Group A

Group B

Qualifying round 3

No teams were eliminated in round 2, but their results will determine the matches of the following round (play-off format with home and away games) held in 2018. These eight teams will face the teams classified 9 to 16 in the latest edition of the tournament, the 2016 Men's European Water Polo Championship.

Playoffs
1st leg: 24 February 2018
2nd leg: 3 March 2018

|}

References 

Men
Men's European Water Polo Championship
Euro
Euro